Richard Lee Burton (March 5, 1907 – death date unknown) was an American Negro league pitcher in the 1930s.

A native of Montgomery, Alabama, Burton played for the Birmingham Black Barons in 1938, and was selected to play in that season's East–West All-Star Game.

References

External links
 and Seamheads

1907 births
Year of death missing
Place of death missing
Birmingham Black Barons players
Baseball pitchers
Baseball players from Montgomery, Alabama